Patricia McNeil is a Canadian costume designer and production designer. She is a three-time winner of the Canadian Screen Award for Best Costume Design, for the films Nelly, The Great Darkened Days (La grande noirceur) and The Twentieth Century, and a winner of the Canadian Screen Award for Best Art Direction/Production Design for The Great Darkened Days.

In 2011, she was nominated for the Genie Award for Costume Design for The Wild Hunt.  McNeil designed the costumes for Anne Émond's 2015 film Our Loved Ones, with The Hollywood Reporter reviewing the costuming as "thankfully not too obsessed with aging and getting the period right". McNeil worked for Émond again on Nelly. She collaborated with Simon Bélanger and José Manuel St-Jacques of UNTTLD on the film, drawing inspiration from Marilyn Monroe.

In addition to designing the costumes, McNeil served as production designer for The Great Darkened Days.

Awards and nominations

References

External links

Best Costume Design Genie and Canadian Screen Award winners
Canadian costume designers
Canadian production designers
Living people
Year of birth missing (living people)
Best Art Direction/Production Design Genie and Canadian Screen Award winners
Women costume designers
Canadian women in film